Glenealy is a village  west of Wicklow Town, in County Wicklow, on the R752 road. The Dublin–Rosslare railway line also passes through the village.

Since the extension of the N11 dual-carriageway from Dublin to within  of the village in 2004, it has been undergoing population growth, attracting people commuting to Dublin. In the 20 years between the 1996 and 2016 census, the village population grew from 383 to 694 people.

The village has a school, pub and a small shop known to the locals as the 'yellow shop'.

Transport
Bus Éireann route 133 serves the village providing links to Dublin, Bray, Wicklow, Rathnew, Rathdrum, Avoca and Arklow.

Sport
Glenealy Hurling Club has won the Wicklow Senior Hurling Championship 16 times as of 2020, most recently beating Carnew in the 2018 county final. They were also the first Wicklow team to make it through to a Leinster Final. In 2017, the club reached the final of the Leinster intermediate club championship, but lost to Ballyragget of Kilkenny by one point.

See also
List of towns and villages in Ireland

References

External links
 Glenealy Hurling club

Towns and villages in County Wicklow